Luis Perdomo may refer to:

Luis Perdomo (baseball, born 1984), Dominican professional baseball pitcher for the San Diego Padres and Minnesota Twins
Luis Perdomo (baseball, born 1993), Dominican professional baseball pitcher for the Milwaukee Brewers
Luis Perdomo (pianist) (born 1971), Venezuelan jazz pianist, based in New York City